Jan Lammers (30 September 1926 – 1 September 2011) was a Dutch sprinter. He competed in the 200 m and 4 × 100 m relay events at the 1948 Summer Olympics and finished in sixth place in the relay.

As a teenager Lammers trained in gymnastics and changed to athletics only after World War II. At the 1946 European Athletics Championships he was part of the Dutch 4 × 100 m team (with Jo Zwaan, Gabe Scholten and Chris van Osta) that finished in fourth place. In 1948 he won his first Dutch title, in the 200 m. Two years later, he won two national sprint titles and a bronze medal in the 200 m event at the 1950 European Athletics Championships. He was preparing for the 1952 Summer Olympics, but tore a muscle. The same year he got married, retired from competitions and later worked as a garage keeper.

Competition record

References

1926 births
2011 deaths
Dutch male sprinters
Athletes (track and field) at the 1948 Summer Olympics
European Athletics Championships medalists
Olympic athletes of the Netherlands
People from Drachten
Sportspeople from Friesland